Monika Bejnar (born 10 March 1981, Tarnów) is a retired Polish sprint athlete.

She finished 4th in the 200m final at the 2006 European Athletics Championships in Gothenburg.

She also competed in the 4 × 400 m relay team for Poland in the 2004 Olympics.

Competition record

See also
 Polish records in athletics

External links
 

1981 births
Living people
Polish female sprinters
Athletes (track and field) at the 2004 Summer Olympics
Athletes (track and field) at the 2008 Summer Olympics
Olympic athletes of Poland
European Athletics Championships medalists
Universiade medalists in athletics (track and field)
Sportspeople from Tarnów
Skra Warszawa athletes
Universiade silver medalists for Poland
Medalists at the 2005 Summer Universiade
Olympic female sprinters
21st-century Polish women